Dominika Anna Krois (born 1972) is a Polish civil servant and diplomat who serves as a Permanent Representative of Poland to the United Nations Office at Vienna since November 2019.

Life 
Krois Krois graduated from law at the Jagiellonian University and received a Ph.D. in law at the same university in 2006, defending thesis International legal instruments against corruption. She has been also studying at the Diplomatic Academy of Vienna.

In 1999, she joined the Ministry of Foreign Affairs of Poland. She was working as Second Secretary for EU affairs at the Embassy in Berlin (2001–2005) and as First Secretary, Counsellor and First Counsellor at the Permanent Representation of Poland to the UN Office and International Organisations in Vienna, being responsible for issues of security, non-proliferation, terrorism and official development assistance (2006–2010). She was also a deputy chair of the Conference of the States Parties to the United Nations Convention against Transnational Organized Crime. At the MFA, Krois worked at the departments of the European Union, Legal and Treaty Affairs, and Foreign Policy Strategy and Planning. She was serving also as a member of the European External Action Service at the EU Delegation to the International Organisations in Vienna (2011–2015), and as the coordinator of the relations with OSCE, being in charge of the European security policy, and relations with Eastern Europe countries (2015–2019). On 10 October 2019, she was appointed the Permanent Representative of Poland to the UN Office and International Organisations at Vienna. She began her mission in November 2019.

Besides Polish, she speaks fluently English, French, and German. She is also communicative in Croatian, Spanish, and Russian.

References 

1972 births
International law scholars
Jagiellonian University alumni
Living people
Permanent Representatives of Poland to the United Nations
Polish officials of the European Union
Polish women ambassadors